Bangladesh–Germany relations are the bilateral relations between Bangladesh and Germany. Germany  maintains an embassy in Dhaka, and Bangladesh has an embassy in Berlin.

History 
After the independence of Bangladesh in 1971, East Germany was the third country in the world, and the first country in Europe, to officially recognise Bangladesh in 1972. After establishment of diplomatic relations, the bilateral relations between the two countries began to grow steadily.

Cultural
The German and Bengali people have a century-old cultural exchange history. German interest in the culture of Bengal dates back to the visits to Germany by the Bengali national poet and Nobel laureate for literature Rabindranath Tagore in the 1920s and 1930s. Many Bangladeshi writers, artists and philosophers take a keen and informed interest in German literature, art, architecture and philosophy. Rapidly increasing contacts amongst German and Bangladeshi artists, primarily in fine arts, photography, film and theatre are well appreciated from both countries.  On 6 October 2010 Deutsche Welle (DW), officially launched its programmes in Bengali using the FM frequencies of the state-run radio station Bangladesh Betar.

The cultural cooperation between both countries is mainly channeled through the Goethe Institute that work on developing the cultural ties by sponsoring local and German cultural activities. It is also one of the main meeting place for all those interested in Germany. To exchange experience in primary education section an innovative programme called "Schools: Partners for the Future," was introduced by the  Goethe Institute, which allows the primary school teacher training in Germany.

Economic relations
As an economic power as well as an important member of the European Union (EU), Germany is a reliable partner of Bangladesh in development co-operation.

In trade with Germany, Bangladesh has for years recorded a large surplus. Germany is the second largest export market of Bangladesh after the US. Bilateral trade is with about 4.5 billion euros in 2012. A German-Bangladeshi investment promotion and protection agreement has been in force since 1986 and a bilateral double taxation accord since 1993. So far German direct investments in Bangladesh are almost €60 million. The Bangladesh-German Chamber of Commerce and Industry (BGCCI) acts as a business platform and mediator between both the countries.

Bilateral visits
On 25 October 2011 the Prime Minister of Bangladesh Sheikh Hasina met German chancellor Angela Merkel in Germany, on a four-day official visit to attend the World Health Summit 2011, along with a meeting on the two nations. The former President of the Federal Republic of Germany, Christian Wulff,  visited Bangladesh from 28 November to 30 November 2011 accompanied by Members of the German Parliament, State Secretaries of the German Foreign Office and the German Ministry for Economics and Technology as well as a high-level business delegation.

See also
 Foreign relations of Bangladesh 
 Foreign relations of Germany

References

Further reading
 

 
Germany
Bilateral relations of Germany